Common Cause is a watchdog group based in Washington, D.C.

Common Cause may also refer to:
 Common Cause (South Australia), an organization formed during World War II to consider post-war reconstruction
 Common Cause, the journal of the Australian Coal and Shale Employees' Federation edited by Sam Rosa
 Common Cause Magazine, an award-winning political and investigative journal founded by Florence Graves
 Common Cause Partnership, an Anglican alliance in North America
 Common cause and special cause (statistics), a concept in statistics
 Common Cause (magazine), a periodical (1947-1951) devoted to advocating world government, edited by Elisabeth Mann Borgese
 Common Cause, a U.K. organization founded by :C. A. Smith in 1951
 Common Cause - No Aircraft Noise, a minor Australian political party that operated from 1995 until 1999
 Spilna Sprava, a Ukrainian radical opposition group

See also
 For Common Cause,  a London-based charity founded in April 2013
 Our Common Cause, (French: Notre Cause Commune, NCC), a political party in Benin
 The Common Cause, a lost 1919 American silent comedy film
 The Common Cause (NUWSS newspaper), a newspaper representing the views of the National Union of Women's Suffrage Societies
 Spurious relationship, relationship based on a shared cause